"Break It Up" is a song by German hard dance band Scooter, released on 21 November 1996 as the second single from their third album, Wicked! (1996). Written by Nosie Katzmann, it was a top-20 hit in several countries, like Austria, Finland and Germany. On the Eurochart Hot 100, it peaked at number 65 in February 1997.

Critical reception
British magazine Music Week rated "Break It Up" four out of five, adding, "Shock of the week – the German trio press pause on their noisy techno and unleash a simple but stunning ballad instead. If radio bites, this could be huge." In a second review two months later, they gave it five out of five, writing, "This epic ballad, a massive hit on the continent, has been around for two or three months and, with greater familiarity, sounds even more anthemic. It could be massive."

Music video
The accompanying music video for "Break it Up" was directed by Rainer Thieding and features the band performing on a train.

Track listing
 12"
 "Break It Up" – 3:38
 "Scooter Del Mar" – 4:58
 "Wednesday (Kontor Mix)" – 6:52

 CD single, France
 "Break It Up" – 3:38
 "Wednesday (Kontor Mix)" – 6:52

 CD maxi
 "Break It Up" – 3:38
 "Break It Up (Unplugged)" – 3:36
 "Wednesday (Kontor Mix)" – 6:52

Charts

References

Scooter (band) songs
1996 singles
Songs written by Nosie Katzmann
1996 songs
Music videos directed by Rainer Thieding
Pop ballads